This is a partial discography of Pagliacci, an opera by Ruggero Leoncavallo which premiered at the Teatro Dal Verme in Milan on May 21, 1892 conducted by Arturo Toscanini.

Stand-alone recordings

Paired with Pietro Mascagni's Cavalleria rusticana

Paired with Puccini's Il tabarro

References

Opera discographies